The Historic Resources Act (the Act) is a provincial statute which allows for the identification, protection and rehabilitation of archaeological, palaeontological, and cultural heritage sites in the province of Newfoundland and Labrador, Canada.

The Act is divided into five (5) parts:
 Administration, setting out limitations, the duties of the Minister, and the acquisition and use of funds for the purposes of the Act;
 Historic and Palaeontological Resources, pertaining to archaeological and palaeontological investigation, regulating development of sensitive sites, and vesting title to uncovered artifacts and fossils in the Crown;
 Historic Sites, establishing a provincial registry and respecting the recognition and acquisition of provincial historic sites, palaeontologically significant sites, and provincial cultural resources;
 Heritage Foundation, pertaining to the establishment of the Heritage Foundation of Newfoundland and Labrador as a Crown corporation and its powers to recognize provincial registered heritage structures and registered heritage districts; and
 General, enabling the registration of conservation easements, the creation of regulations pursuant to the act, enforcement, and offences under the Act.

The Historic Resources Act was enacted in 1990 replacing a previous act, An Act Respecting The Preservation Of The Historic Resources Of The Province (Historic Resources Act), enacted in 1985.

See also
Heritage conservation in Canada
List of historic places in Newfoundland and Labrador
List of National Historic Sites of Canada in Newfoundland and Labrador

References

External links
Historic Resources Act (RSNL 1990)
Historic Resources Act (SN1985 c33 s1)

Newfoundland and Labrador